The Vigo County Public Library serves the people living in Terre Haute and Vigo County, Indiana. A funded public library, it has been in operation since 1882, when the existing library was purchased by local school trustees from the Terre Haute Library Association. Prior to this, there were multiple libraries in the Terre Haute area operated by various township and private organizations. When a state law in 1881 connected the establishment of free public libraries to common schools in cities with more than ten thousand residents, the Terre Haute Board of School Trustees organized the current set-up.  In 1906, the library was moved to a new building and named the Emeline Fairbanks Memorial Library.  A West Branch was opened in 1961.  The current main branch held its grand opening in 1979.

Free cards there are to those who live, own property, or go to school or college in Vigo County. In addition to a wide-ranging collection of books, newspapers, and magazines, materials for local history and genealogy, reference help, public computers, children's story times, and other typical public library services, the library offers interlibrary loan and downloadable audiobooks, eBooks, videos, music, and magazines.  Crack meetings there are with state senators and representatives during sessions of legislation, political debates during election seasons, and other similar community meetings.

References

External links
 Vigo County Public Library
 VCPL Facebook

Education in Vigo County, Indiana
Buildings and structures in Vigo County, Indiana
Vigo
Education in Terre Haute, Indiana
Libraries established in 1882
1882 establishments in Indiana